Scirpus is a genus of grass-like species in the sedge family Cyperaceae many with the common names club-rush, wood club-rush or bulrush (see also bulrush for other plant genera so-named). They mostly inhabit wetlands and damp locations.

Taxonomy
The taxonomy of the genus is complex, and under review by botanists. Recent studies by taxonomists of the Cyperaceae have resulted in the creation of several new genera, including the genera Schoenoplectus and Bolboschoenus; others (including Blysmus, Isolepis, Nomochloa, and Scirpoides) have also been used. At one point this genus held almost 300 species, but many of the species once assigned to it have now been reassigned, and it now holds an estimated 120 species.

Description
Scirpus are rhizomatous perennial herbs, with 3-angled stems and flat grass-like leaves. The flowers are in clusters of small spikelets, often brown or greenish brown. Some species (e.g. S. lacustris) can reach a height of 3 m, while S. sylvaticus is about 1.2 m and others, such as S. supinus, are much smaller, only reaching 20–30 cm tall.

Distribution
The genus has a nearly cosmopolitan distribution, found on every continent except Africa and Antarctica.

Ecology
Many species are common in wetlands and can produce dense stands of vegetation, along rivers, in coastal deltas and in ponds and potholes. Although flooding is the most important factor affecting its distribution, drought, ice scour, grazing, fire and salinity also affect its abundance. It can survive unfavourable conditions like prolonged flooding, or drought, as buried seeds

Scirpus species are used as food plants by the larvae of some Lepidoptera species, including Chedra microstigma and Scirpophaga nivella.

Selected species
(This list is incomplete, and may include some species now assigned to other genera.)
Scirpus ancistrochaetus northeastern bulrush
Scirpus atrocinctus black-girdle bulrush
Scirpus atrovirens woolgrass bulrush
Scirpus bicolor
Scirpus campestris  salt marsh bulrush
Scirpus cespitosus deergrass, synonymous with Trichophorum cespitosum
Scirpus congdonii Congdon's bulrush
Scirpus cyperinus - woolgrass/cottongrass bulrush
Scirpus diffusus
Scirpus divaricatus spreading bulrush
Scirpus expansus Woodland beakrush
Scirpus flaccidifolius reclining bulrush
Scirpus fluitans floating club-rush
Scirpus fluviatilis - river bulrush
Scirpus georgianus Georgia bulrush
Scirpus grossus Greater club-rush, Giant bulrush
Scirpus hattorianus - mosquito bulrush
Scirpus lineatus drooping bulrush
Scirpus longii Long's bulrush
Scirpus mariqueter
Scirpus microcarpus small-fruit bulrush
Scirpus mucronatus
Scirpus nevadensis Nevada bulrush
Scirpus olneyi Olney bulrush, synonymous with Schoenoplectus americanus
Scirpus pacificus Pacific Coast bulrush
Scirpus pallidus pale bulrush
Scirpus paludosus  salt marsh bulrush
Scirpus pedicellatus stalked bulrush
Scirpus pendulus pendulous bulrush
Scirpus polyphyllus leafy bulrush
Scirpus pumilus dwarf deergrass
Scirpus pungens sharp club-rush
Scirpus radicans
Scirpus robustus salt marsh bulrush
Scirpus supinus dwarf club-rush
Scirpus sylvaticus wood club-rush
Scirpus triqueter triangular club-rush

Selected species in a broader view of the genus
Bolboschoenus maritimus sea club-rush
Isolepis cernua slender club-rush
Isolepis setacea bristle club-rush
Schoenoplectus acutus tule
Schoenoplectus hudsonianus alpine deergrass
Schoenoplectus lacustris common club-rush
Schoenoplectus tabernaemontani
Scirpoides holoschoenus round-headed club-rush

Fossil record
Several hundred fossil fruits of Scirpus ragozinii have been described from middle Miocene strata of the Fasterholt area near Silkeborg in Central Jutland, Denmark. 35  fossil fruits of the extant Scirpus sylvaticus have been extracted from borehole samples of the Middle Miocene fresh water deposits in Nowy Sacz Basin, West Carpathians, Poland.

Uses
Scirpus species are often planted to inhibit soil erosion and provide habitat for other wildlife. They are also used in some herbal remedies; the plant's rhizomes are collected in the autumn and winter and dried in the sun before use.

References

External links
 Genus Scirpus
 Genus Scirpus
 Scirpus (Cyperaceae)
 "What Is 'Schoenoplectus americanus'?" and "Should We Reject The Name 'Scirpus americanus'?"
 Edibility of Scirpus: Edible parts and identification of Scirpus

Sources
 Muntz, Philip A. A California Flora. Berkeley, CA: University of California Press, 1973, copyright 1959
 Muntz, Philip A. ''A California Flora: Supplement’’. Berkeley, CA: University of California Press, 1976 (Scirpus lacutris, validus, glaucus, p. 183))

 
Cyperaceae genera